Far Eastern A-mart Co., Ltd., doing business as a.mart, is a hypermarket chain in Taiwan. It is a direct subsidiary of Far Eastern Department Stores, which in turn is part of the Far Eastern Group conglomerate. It has its head office in Zhongzheng District, Taipei.

It was previously Far Eastern Geant Co., Ltd. (same corporate name in Chinese), doing business as Far Eastern Geant (T: 愛買吉安/愛買Geant, S: 爱买吉安/爱买Geant, P: Àimǎi Jí'ān). Casino Guichard-Perrachon SA owned a 50% stake in the company. In 2004 it was the third largest hypermarket chain in Taiwan. The store began offering a membership card that year. Casino decided to exit Taiwan in order to focus on Brazil, Thailand, and other rapidly expanding markets in order to gain sales growth more quickly. In September 2006 sold its 50% stake, which was worth $738 million New Taiwan dollars, to Far Eastern Department Stores.  In 2006 Far Eastern Geant was still the third largest hypermarket chain in Taiwan, with over NT$13 billion in sales; this was an 11% increase from its 2005 figures. At that time the company was still making losses.

See also

 List of companies of Taiwan

References

External links
 A.mart 
 Far Eastern Géant  (Archive)

Far Eastern Group
Retail companies of Taiwan
Supermarkets of Taiwan
Companies based in Taipei